is a 1957 black and white Japanese film directed by Ishirō Honda.

Production designer was Iwao Akune, lighting technician was Yoshio Tanaka and sound technician was Sanya Yamamoto.

Cast
 Chikage Oogi
 Hiroshi Koizumi
 Chiyoko Shimakura
 Akihiko Hirata
 Machiko Kitagawa
 Fuyuki Murakami
 Minosuke Yamada
 Rikie Sanjo
 Soji Ubukata
 Toshiko Nakano
 Tadao Nakamura

References

External links
 

1957 films
Films directed by Ishirō Honda
Japanese black-and-white films
1950s Japanese films
Japanese drama films